Rear Admiral Christopher Erson Smith,  is a senior officer in the Royal Australian Navy. He has commanded the ships  (2002–04),  (2008–10) and the flagship  (2015–17), and served as Deputy Chief of Navy from September 2020 to December 2022. He was appointed Commander Australian Fleet on 16 December 2022.

Naval career
Smith joined the Royal Australian Navy (RAN) in 1989 as a midshipman at the Royal Australian Naval College, HMAS Creswell. He was awarded the Conspicuous Service Medal in the 2002 Australia Day Honours, and appointed a Member of the Order of Australia in the 2023 Australia Day Honours.

References

|-

Australian military personnel of the Iraq War
Living people
Members of the Order of Australia
Recipients of the Conspicuous Service Medal
Royal Australian Navy admirals
University of Canberra alumni
University of Wollongong alumni
Year of birth missing (living people)